Leucospis affinis is a species of parasitic wasp of megachilid bees. It can be found in North America.

References

Chalcidoidea
Hymenoptera of North America
Insects described in 1824